Benkovac is a town in the interior of Zadar County, Croatia.

Geography
Benkovac is located where the plain of Ravni Kotari and the karstic plateau of Bukovica meet, 20 km from  the town of Biograd na Moru and 30 km from Zadar. The Zagreb-Split motorway and Zadar-Knin railway pass through the town. It borders the municipalities of Novigrad, Posedarje, Obrovac, Lišane Ostrovičke, Kistanje and Stankovci.

Demography
According to the 2011 census, the municipality had 11,026 inhabitants of which 13.8% were from a Serbian descent and 84.9% were Croatian. Before the Croatian War of Independence, Serbs made up about 57%, and Croats about 41%, however Croats only held 18% of the jobs in the local government, which led to high tensions in the 1990s. During Operation Storm (Oluja), almost all of the Serbs fled or were forced from the town, and after the war they were replaced by Bosnian Croat settlers.

According to the Austrian Census in 1900, the town of Benkovac consisted of 356 Catholics and 156 Orthodox, with area surrounding Benkovac it included 8,119 Catholics and 5,981 Orthodox.  The 1910 census recorded a total of 810 residents, 388 of which were Catholic and 422 Orthodox. Both censuses were conducted according to religion and language (Serbo-Croatian). The population of Benkovac itself is 2,622 (census 2001), the rest is distributed in 38 villages surrounding it.

History

The first traces of human life in the Benkovac area were found around the village of Smilčić that belonged to the Danilo culture. Before Roman conquest the area was inhabited by the Illyrian tribe of Liburnians. During the Roman Civil war the Liburnians sided with Caesar. The Romans mention the following Liburnian settlements: "Nedinum (Nadin), Carinium (Karin), Varvaria (Bribir) and Asseria (Podgrađe). In 7th century the area was settled by Croats. The area of Benkovac was at the crossroads of four Croatian župas - Novljanska, Sidraška, Bribirska and Karinska. Near the village of Šopot, an inscription from the 9th century was found that mentions Branimir as a Croatian Duke.

In 1409 King  Ladislaus of Naples sold his rights of Dalmatia to the Republic of Venice and the Benkovac area became a border region. New fortresses around the border were built - Korlat, Kličevica, Polača, and behind them Benković i Perušić. The fortress of Benković was named after the family of nobles that built it and the city of Benkovac was established. In 1527 Benkovac became part of the Ottoman Empire. It was settled by Croats-Bunjevci, Serbs and Vlachs.

In October 1683, the population of Venetian Dalmatia, principally Uskoks of Ravni kotari, took arms and together with the rayah (lower class) of the Ottoman frontier regions rose up, taking Skradin, Karin, Vrana, Benkovac and Obrovac. It became part of the Republic of Venice following the Morean War.

Until 1918, the town (with bilingual name BENKOVAC - BENCOVAZ) was part of the Austrian monarchy in the district of the same name, one of 13 Bezirkshauptmannschaften in Dalmatia. The name was BENCOVACZ'' before 1867.

From 1929 to 1939, Benkovac was part of the Littoral Banovina and from 1939 to 1941 of the Banovina of Croatia within the Kingdom of Yugoslavia. The area was bombed by the Allies during World War II.

During the Croatian War of Independence, Benkovac was a center of unrest and hostilities between Croats and Serbs. On 17 March 1990, tensions erupted when groups of local Serbs rebelled against the decision of the government to disarm local police in which Serbs were most of the employees. During that time the provincial Croatian government continued arming police forces and paramilitaries in villages with ethnic Croat majorities. Tensions continued to boil, and five months later, Benkovac was included in the Republic of Serbian Krajina. Five years later on 5 August 1995, Benkovac was retaken by the Croatian Army during Operation Storm.

Towns and villages
The following settlements are part of Benkovac:

 Benkovac (population 2,866)
 Benkovačko Selo (population 789)
 Bjelina (population 92)
 Brgud (population 13)
 Bruška (population 113)
 Buković (population 526)
 Bulić (population 147)
 Dobra Voda (population 113)
 Donje Biljane (population 102)
 Donje Ceranje (population 22)
 Donji Karin (population 174)
 Donji Kašić (population 63)
 Donji Lepuri (population 174)
 Gornje Biljane (population 170)
 Gornje Ceranje (population 62)
 Islam Grčki (population 150)
 Kolarina (population 39)
 Korlat (population 353)
 Kožlovac (population 20)
 Kula Atlagić (population 184)
 Lisičić (population 263)
 Lišane Tinjske (population 97)
 Medviđa (population 140)
 Miranje (population 303)
 Nadin (population 406)
 Perušić Benkovački (population 153)
 Perušić Donji (population 123)
 Podgrađe (population 87)
 Podlug (population 177)
 Popovići (population 210)
 Pristeg (population 316)
 Prović (population 93)
 Radošinovci (population 238)
 Raštević (population 468)
 Rodaljice (population 67)
 Smilčić (population 248)
 Šopot (population 281)
 Tinj (population 530)
 Vukšić (population 513)
 Zagrad (population 85)
 Zapužane (population 56)

Benkovac fair 

One of the most famous attractions in Benkovac is the monthly fair, taking part on every 10th of the month. Originally dealing in livestock, it has grown to become the biggest fair in Dalmatia, offering a wide range of products (e.g. livestock, tools, car parts, antiques, clothes, various foodstuffs, CDs, used books etc), often touted as having "everything from a needle to a locomotive". Visitors often sample the local food, most notably the roast lamb.

References

External links

 
 Historical Monuments of Benkovac
 1991. Census results for Benkovac county

 
Cities and towns in Croatia
Populated places in Zadar County
Kingdom of Dalmatia